Carlos María de Bustamante Merecilla (4 November 1774 – 29 September 1848) was a Mexican statesman, historian, journalist and a supporter of Mexican independence. His historical "work early initiated an important Mexican national tradition of searching out and publishing basic materials on the Indian past and its fate in the colonial period."  His writings in the 1820s shifted "the antiquarian bias of creole patriotism...into the ideology of a national liberation movement."

Biography and works
Carlos María de Bustamante was born in the city of Oaxaca on 4 November 1774. In 1796 he took up the study of law, participated in the attempts to secure Mexico's independence from Spain, and, when that was finally achieved, opposed Agustín de Iturbide's designs to transform the newborn republic into a hereditary monarchy. Repeatedly imprisoned and banished, he was nevertheless appointed to important positions in the Government. The Mexican-American War of 1846-48 was a source of deep grief to him.

He founded the Mexican newspaper Diario de México in 1805 in which he expressed their independence liberal ideas and because this, he went to jail many times. After the Cádiz constitution he founded the newspaper "El Juguetillo". In 1813 José María Morelos y Pavón named him as editor in the independence newspaper Correo Americano del Sur.

Carlos María de Bustamante become deputy for the Provincia de Mexico in the Congress of Chilpancingo where he wrote the inaugural speech for Morelos, which "declared that the insurgents were about to free Mexicans from the chains of serfdom imposed on them in 1521." Bustamante participated in the writing of first Mexican Constitution. He spend most of the time between 1815 and 1822 in jail. In 1822, after Mexican independence was achieved, Bustamente was elected deputy of Oaxaca.

His historical sketch of The Mexican-American War is a sad record of the decay and disintegration which afflicted Mexico at the time. He writes with the greatest frankness, and unsparingly, about the conduct of the war on the Mexican side. His autobiography Lo que se dice, y lo que se hace, 1833, published in 1833, is also valuable as a fragment of contemporary history.

Although constantly concerned in the politics of Mexico and occupying several very responsible positions during the most trying times of the Mexican Republic until the close of the war with the United States, Bustamante became a prominent Mexican historian. He distinguished himself by publishing historical works on colonial times, until then in manuscript and partly forgotten. Above all, his publication of Historia general de las cosas de Nueva España, by Fray Bernardino de Sahagún of the second half of the 16th century, was a service to historical research.

In addition to the work of Sahagún, Bustamante printed the chronicle of Gómara, the work of Veytia on Tezcuco, the dissertations of Gama on two large Mexican sculptures, and others. To the history by Sahagún he added one of the relaciones of Fernando de Alva Ixtlixochitl, selected by him for the passionate spirit which it displays against the Spaniards. Bustamante found the manuscript of exiled Mexican Jesuit Andrés Cavo, Historia civil y política de México (Civil and Political History of Mexico), in Latin and Spanish.  Bustamante published it with a large appendix, under the title Los tres siglos de México bajo el gobierno español hasta la entrada del Ejécito Trigarante (Three Centuries of Mexico Under the Spanish Government until the entry of the Army of the Three Guarantees). The first edition was published in Mexico City in four volumes in 1836-1838. Bustamante also published a portion of Mariano Veytia's Historia antigua de México, which Veytia based on manuscripts collected by Lorenzo Boturini de Benaducci. Bustamante also published in defective form the eighteenth-century writings of Hipólito Villaroel, who wrote about the Spanish treatment of Indians, the colonial power structure regarding the Indians, and the "Indian problem" in Mexico.

In addition to the autobiography mentioned, and the light shed by his other works, the Diccionario universal de Historia y Geografía (Mexico, 1853), contains an exhaustive account of the man. The historian Lucas Alamán wrote biographical material on Bustamante, putting in relief especially his private character and the virtues of his domestic life.

Writings
 Galería de antiguos príncipes mexicanos. Puebla 1821
 Crónica mexicana, Teoamoxtli ó libro que tiene todo lo interesante á usos, costumbres, religión, política y literatura de los antiguos indios tultecas y mexicanos, redactado de un antiguo códice del caballero Boturini. Mexico. Mexico 1822.
 Necesidad de a unión de todos los megicanos [sic] contra las asechanzas de la nación española y liga europea, comprobado con la historia de la antigua República de Tlaxcala. Mexico 1826.
 Mañanas de a alameda de México; publicadas para facilitar a las señoritas el estudio de a historia de su país. 2 vols. Mexico 1835-36.
 Hay tiempos de hablar y tiempos de callar.  Mexico 1833. [Autobiography to 1833]
Apuntes para la historia del gobierno del general Antonio López de Santa Anna
Cuadro histórico de la revolución de la América Mejicana

Edited sources
Historia de las conquistas de Hernando Cortés escrita en español por Francisco López de Gómara, traducida al mexicano por Juan Bautista de San Anton Muñon Chimalpahin quauhtlehuantzin, indio mexicano. 2 vols. Mexico. 1826.
Memoria sobre la guerra del Mixtón en el estado de Jalisco. 1826.
Tezcoco en los últimos tiempos de sus antiguos reyes, ó sea relación tomada de los manuscritos inéditos de Boturini; redactada por el Lic. por el Lic. D. Mariano Veytia. Publicados con notes y adiciones para el estudio de a juventud mexicana. 292 pp. 1826.
Historia del descubrimiento de la América Septentrional por Cristóbal Colón, escrita por el P. Fr. Manuel de la Vega, religioso franciscano de la provincia de México. 250 pp. Mexico. 1826.
Historia de la conquista de México por el P. Fr. Bernardino de Sahagún. 1829.
Horribles crueldades de los conquistadores de México y los indios que los auxiliaron, para subyugarlo a la corona de Castilla, ó sea Memoria por D. Fernando de Ixtlilxochitl. 1829.
Historia general de las cosas de la Nueva España, que en doce libros y dos volúmenes, escribieron por el R. P. Fr. Bernardino de Sahagún, de la observancia de S. Francisco, y uno de los primeros predicadores del Santo Evangelio de aquellas regiones. 3 vols. Mexico 1829-30.
Descripción histórica y cronológica de las dos piedras, que son ocasión del nuevo empredrado que se está formando en la plaza principal de México, se hallaron en ella el año de 1790, por D. Antonio de León y Gama. Mexico 1832.

Further reading

Alamán, Historia de México (Mexico, 1848)
 Idem, Disertaciones sobre la Historia de la República Mexicana (Mexico, 1848)
 Diccionario hispano-americano.

References

1774 births
1848 deaths
Members of the Chamber of Deputies (Mexico)
People of the Mexican War of Independence
19th-century Mexican historians
Historians of Mexico
Historians of Mesoamerica
Mexican Mesoamericanists
19th-century Mexican lawyers
Mexican soldiers
People from Oaxaca City
19th-century Mesoamericanists